Mount Tanagra is a mountain in Greece

Mount Tanagra was known as Mount Cerycius in Ancient Greece. It was the place in which the Greek hero Orion's tomb was buried in. It has been said to be the birthplace of Hermes.

References

Tanagra